Plano station may refer to different rail stations in the United States.

 Plano station (Illinois), serving Plano, Illinois
 Downtown Plano station of the Dallas Area Rapid Transit, serving Plano, Texas
 Plano Station, Texas Electric Railway, a historic rail depot served by the Texas Electric Railway
 Parker Road station, the terminus of the Dallas Area Rapid Transit line in Plano, Texas